Raí da Silva Pessanha (born 21 April 2002), simply known as Raí, is a Brazilian footballer who plays as a midfielder for Botafogo.

Club career
Born in the neighborhood of Maré, Rio de Janeiro, Raí joined Botafogo in 2015, aged 13. After impressing with the under-20s in the 2022 Copa São Paulo de Futebol Júnior, he made his first team debut on 30 January of that year, coming on as a late substitute for Breno in a 2–0 Campeonato Carioca home win over Bangu.

Raí scored his first senior goal on 3 February 2022, scoring his team's fourth in a 4–2 home win over Madureira.

Career statistics

References

2002 births
Living people
Footballers from Rio de Janeiro (city)
Brazilian footballers
Association football midfielders
Botafogo de Futebol e Regatas players